The Rice Owls football program represents Rice University in the sport of American football. The team competes at the NCAA Division I FBS level and compete in the American Athletic Conference. Rice Stadium, built in 1950, hosts the Owls' home football games. Rice has the second-smallest undergraduate enrollment of any FBS member, ahead of only Tulsa.

History
Rice fielded its first football team in 1912, not long after opening its doors. Three years later, it joined the Southwest Conference as a charter member.

For the better part of half a century, Rice was a regional and national powerhouse. However, by the early 1960s, Rice found it increasingly difficult to field competitive teams. For most of its tenure in the SWC, it was one of only four private schools in the conference, and by far the smallest in terms of undergraduate enrollment. However, by the latter part of longtime coach Jess Neely's tenure, Rice found itself competing against schools ten times or more its size, and often had more freshmen than Rice had total undergraduates. From 1964 to 1991, Rice had only one overall winning season, and only finished as high as third in SWC play once.

Fred Goldsmith took over as head coach in 1989, and led the Owls to a 6-5 overall record and a tie for second place in 1992, their best finish in 28 years. However, a 61-34 loss to in-city rival Houston kept them out of their first bowl game in 31 years. Goldsmith left for Duke in 1993 and was succeeded by former Clemson coach Ken Hatfield, who tallied only three winning seasons in 12 years. While the Owls were bowl-eligible in those three years, they didn't receive bowl bids due to their small alumni and fan base.

Todd Graham became head coach in 2006, and led the Owls to their first bowl game in 35 years, the 2006 New Orleans Bowl. He left after only one year and was succeeded by David Bailiff, who took the Owls to three bowl games in 11 years, including their first 10-win seasons in half a century.

1954 Cotton Bowl Classic
The Owls played in the eighteenth Cotton Bowl Classic against the Crimson Tide of Alabama. The game featured one of the most famous plays in college football history when Rice's Dickey Moegle (later Maegle) burst free on a sweep play, and on his way down the sideline, was tackled by Tommy Lewis, who had come off the Alabama sideline without his helmet to tackle Moegle. Referee Cliff Shaw saw Lewis come off the bench and gave the Owls the 95 yard touchdown. Rice would win the game 28–6, with the only Crimson Tide score coming from Lewis.  The yardage added to Moegle's 265 yards rushing, a Cotton Bowl Classic record that would stand until Tony Temple's effort in 2008. This would be the Owls' last bowl win until the 2008 Texas Bowl, a win which also secured the Owls their first 10-win season since 1949.

Kennedy Speech 

Rice Stadium also hosted a "We choose to go to the Moon" speech by John F. Kennedy on September 12, 1962. In it, he used the Rice football team to challenge America to send a man to the Moon before 1970.

"But why, some say, the Moon? Why choose this as our goal? And they may well ask why climb the highest mountain? Why, 35 years ago, fly the Atlantic? Why does Rice play Texas?  We choose to go to the Moon. We choose to go to the Moon in this decade and do the other things, not because they are easy, but because they are hard, because that goal will serve to organize and measure the best of our energies and skills, because that challenge is one that we are willing to accept, one we are unwilling to postpone, and one which we intend to win, and the others, too."

Conference affiliations
 Independent (1912–1914) 
 Southwest Conference (1915–1996)
 Western Athletic Conference (1996–2004)
 Conference USA (2005–2023)
 American Athletic Conference (2023–present)

Head coaches

† 15–27–2 overall per NCAA due to 1975 forfeit win over Mississippi State.

Championships

Conference championships
Rice has won eight conference championships, five outright and three shared.

† Co-championship

Division championships
Rice has won two division championships.

† Co-championship

Bowl games
Rice has participated in 13 bowl games, garnering a record of 7–6.

Stadium

Rice Stadium was built in 1950, and has been the home of Owls football ever since. It hosted the NFL Super Bowl in January 1974. It replaced the old Rice Field (now Rice Track/Soccer Stadium) to increase seating. Total seating capacity in the current stadium was reduced from 70,000 to 47,000 before the 2006 season. The endzone seating benches were removed and covered with tarps, and all of the wooden bleachers were replaced with new, metal seating benches in 2006, as well. The stadium is also undergoing further renovations.

Rivalries

SMU

Rice and SMU were members of the same conference from 1918 through 2012, and have played each other 90 times as of 2012 with SMU leading the series 48–41–1. The rivalry is because Rice and SMU were two of four private schools in the Southwest Conference (Baylor and TCU were the others). Rice and SMU were also the two smallest schools in the conference, were located in the two largest cities of any teams in the conference (Houston and Dallas, respectively), and have historically been considered the two best private universities in Texas.

SMU leads the series 48–41–1 as of 2017.

Houston

Rice participates in a crosstown rivalry with Houston. UH and Rice play annually for the Bayou Bucket, a weathered bucket found by former Rice guard Fred Curry at an antique shop. Curry had it designed into a trophy for $310. The two universities are separated by five miles in Houston. The Cougars lead the series 33–11.The Cougars' 2013 move from Conference USA to the American Athletic Conference has jeopardized the status of the series.

Houston leads the series 33–11 after a win in September 2022.

Texas

Rice and Texas have maintained a largely one-sided rivalry beginning in the early days of the Southwest Conference. Texas' 28 consecutive victories from 1966–1993 represents the sixth longest single-opponent winning streak in college football history.  In 1994, in a nationally televised ESPN game, Rice scored a major upset win over Texas, but since then Texas has resumed series dominance.  Despite the dissolution of the Southwest Conference, Texas and Rice still play on a "near annual" basis, allowing the Longhorns to keep a high profile in the state's largest city and the fourth largest city in the United States.

Texas leads the series 72–21–1 as of the conclusion of the 2017 season.

College Football Hall of Fame

Eight former Rice players and coaches have been inducted in the College Football Hall of Fame.

All-Americans
As of 2017, the following 18 players have been named All-America with 6 selection being consensus.

† Consensus selection

Other notable players

 Tony Barker, LB Washington Redskins
 Chris Boswell, K Pittsburgh Steelers
 O.J. Brigance, LB multiple teams
 James Casey, TE/FB multiple teams
 Bryce Callahan, DB Chicago Bears
Earl Cooper, RB San Francisco 49ers
 Vince Courville, WR multiple teams
 Christian Covington, DL Houston Texans
 Patrick Dendy, DB Green Bay Packers
 Buddy Dial, WR, multiple teams
 Jarett Dillard, WR Jacksonville Jaguars
 Michael Downs, S Dallas Cowboys
 Emmanuel Ellerbee, LB Seattle Seahawks
 Bert Emanuel, WR multiple teams
 Jack Fox, P Detroit Lions
 Phillip Gaines, DB multiple teams
 Darryl Grant, OL Washington Redskins
 Courtney Hall, OL San Diego Chargers
 King Hill, QB, multiple teams
 Donald Hollas, QB Oakland Raiders
 Robert Hubble, TE San Francisco 49ers
 Larry Izzo, LB New England Patriots
 N.D. Kalu, DE multiple teams
 Tommy Kramer, QB Minnesota Vikings
 Mike Martir, QB Canadian football 
 LaDouphyous McCalla, DB Saskatchewan Roughriders
 Vance McDonald, TE Pittsburgh Steelers
 Primo Miller, T Cleveland Rams
 Cheta Ozougwu, DE, multiple teams
 Ryan Pontbriand, DS Cleveland Browns
 Frank Ryan, QB Cleveland Browns
 Andrew Sendejo, DB Cleveland Browns
 Scott Solomon, DE multiple teams
 Seaman Squyres, HB Cincinnati Reds
 Jordan Taylor, WR Denver Broncos
 John Underwood, G Milwaukee Badgers
 Austin Walter, RB San Francisco 49ers
 Joe Watson, Detroit Lions
 Bones Weatherly, LB Chicago Bears
 Luke Willson, TE Seattle Seahawks

Future non-conference opponents 
Announced schedules as of August 11, 2022.

References

External links

 

Rice Owls football
American football teams established in 1912
1912 establishments in Texas